Spiritual direction is the practice of being with people as they attempt to deepen their relationship with the divine, or to learn and grow in their personal spirituality.  The person seeking direction shares stories of their encounters of the divine, or how they are cultivating a life attuned to spiritual things.  The director listens and asks questions to assist the directee in his or her process of reflection and spiritual growth. Spiritual direction advocates claim that it develops a deeper awareness with the spiritual aspect of being human, and that it is neither psychotherapy nor counseling nor financial planning.

Historians of philosophy like Ilsetraut and Pierre Hadot have argued that spiritual direction was already practiced and recommended by the main schools of philosophy, as well as by physicians like Galen, as part of spiritual practices in Ancient Greece and Rome.

Roman Catholic forms 
While there is some degree of variability, there are primarily two forms of spiritual direction in the Roman Catholic Church: regular direction and retreat direction. They differ largely in the frequency of meeting and in the intensity of reflection.

Regular direction can involve a one- to two-hour meeting every four to eight weeks, and thus is slightly less intense than retreat direction, although spiritual exercises and disciplines are often given for the directee to attempt between meetings.

If the directee is on a retreat (lasting a weekend, a week or even 40 days), they will generally meet with their director on a daily basis for one hour. During these daily meetings, exercises or spiritual disciplines such as lectio divina are given to the directee as fodder to continue his or her spiritual growth.

The Spiritual Exercises of Ignatius of Loyola are a popular example of guidelines used for spiritual direction.

Historical traditions

Ancient Greece and Rome 
Most of ancient schools of philosophy remarked the importance of spiritual direction in order to improve moral education. This guidance, a kind of "therapy of the souls", led the pupils to self-awareness of their faults and progress. Socrates can be considered as the ideal of spiritual director among his followers, but Plato also guided his students with personal advice and comfort through their learning process. Aristotle would have fixed some rules for a proper spiritual guidance of pupils in the second book of his Rhetoric. Other examples can be found in Cynics, Epicureans —who used epistolary form for this purpose (e.g., Metrodorus)— or Stoics —like Marcus Aurelius, Seneca, Musonius Rufus or Epictetus in his Discourses—, who actively practiced spiritual direction. Philodemus' work On Frank Criticism showed that spiritual guidance should be based on freedom of speech (parrhesia) and mutual respect between master and pupil. A physician like Galen, not affiliated to any school of philosophy, recommended to follow spiritual guidance from an aged and experienced man before attempting self-examination.

Western Christianity 
Within Christianity, spiritual direction has its roots in early Christianity.  The gospels describe Jesus serving as a mentor to his disciples. Additionally, Acts of the Apostles Chapter 9 describes Ananias helping Paul of Tarsus to grow in his newfound experience of Christianity.  Likewise, several of the Pauline epistles describe Paul mentoring both Timothy and Titus among others.  Tradition tells us that John the Evangelist tutored Polycarp, the 2nd-century bishop of Smyrna.

Theologian John Cassian who lived in the 4th century provided some of the earliest recorded guidelines on the Christian practice of spiritual direction.  He introduced mentoring in the monasteries. Each novice was put under the care of an older monk. Benedict of Nursia integrated Cassian's guidelines into what is now known as the Rule of Saint Benedict.

Spiritual direction is widespread in the Catholic tradition: a person with wisdom and spiritual discernment, usually but not exclusively a priest or consecrated in general, provides counsel to a person who wishes to make a journey of faith and discovery of God's will in his life. The spiritual guide aims to discern, understand what the Holy Spirit, through the situations of life, spiritual insights fruit of prayer, reading and meditation on the Bible, tells the person accompanied. The spiritual father or spiritual director may provide advice, give indications of life and prayer, resolving doubts in matters of faith and morals without replacing the choices and decisions to the person accompanying.

Eastern Orthodoxy
Eastern Orthodoxy comes from the same pre-schism traditions, but the role of a "spiritual director" or "elder" in Orthodoxy has maintained its important role.  The original Greek term geron (meaning "elder", as in gerontology) was rendered by the Russian word starets, from Old Church Slavonic starĭtsĭ, "elder", derived from starŭ, "old". The Greek tradition has a long unbroken history of elders and disciples, such as Sophronius and John Moschos in the seventh century, Symeon the Elder and Symeon the New Theologian in the eleventh century, and contemporary charismatic gerontes such as Porphyrios and Paisios. Sergius of Radonezh and Nil Sorsky were two most venerated startsy of Old Muscovy. The revival of elders in the Slavic world is associated with the name of Paisius Velichkovsky (1722–94), who produced the Russian translation of the Philokalia. The most famous Russian starets of the early 19th century was Seraphim of Sarov (1759-1833), who went on to become one of the most revered Orthodox saints.
The Optina Pustyn near Kozelsk used to be celebrated for its startsy (Schema-Archimandrite Moses, Schema-Hegumen Anthony, Hieroschemamonk Leonid, Hieroschemamonk Macarius, Hieroschemamonk Hilarion, Hieroschemamonk Ambrose, Hieroschemamonk Anatole (Zertsalov)).[1] Such writers as Nikolay Gogol, Aleksey Khomyakov, Leo Tolstoy and Konstantin Leontyev sought advice from the elders of this monastery. They also inspired the figure of Zosima in Dostoyevsky's novel The Brothers Karamazov. A more modern example of a starets is Archimandrite John Krestiankin (1910-2006) of the Pskov Monastery of the Caves who was popularly recognized as such by many Orthodox living in Russia.

Judaism 
In Judaism, the Hebrew term for spiritual director differs among traditional communities. The verb Hashpa'ah is common in some communities though not all; the spiritual director called a mashpi'a occurs in the Chabad-Lubavitch community and also in the Jewish Renewal community. A  mashgiach ruchani is the equivalent role among adherents of the Mussar tradition. The purpose of Hashpa'ah is to support the directee in her or his personal relationship with God, and to deepen that person's ability to find God's presence in ordinary life. Amongst Lubavitchers this draws on the literature and praxis of Hasidism as it is practiced according to Chabad standards, and to Jewish mystical tradition generally. Spiritual mentorship is customary in the Hasidic world, but not necessarily in the same way.

Sufism 
In Sufism, the term used for spiritual master is murshid, Arabic for "guide" or "teacher". He is more than a spiritual director and believed to be guiding the disciples based on his direct connectivity with the Divine. The murshid's role is to spiritually guide and verbally instruct the disciple on the Sufi path after the disciple takes an oath of allegiance or Bay'ah (bai'ath) with him. The concept of Murshid Kamil Akmal (also known as Insan-e-Kamil) is significant in most tariqas. The doctrine states that from pre-existence till pre-eternity, there shall always remain a Qutb or a Universal Man upon the earth who would be the perfect manifestation of God and at the footsteps of the Islamic prophet Muhammad.

See also
 Direction of prayer
 Ho'oponopono 
 Murshid
 Pir (Sufism)
 Spiritual Directors International

Notes

References
 Spiritual Direction – New Advent (1913 Catholic Encyclopedia).

Bibliography

Classics
 
 
 
 
 
 
 
  Alt
 
 --do.-- (1900) A Book of Spiritual Instruction: Institutio spiritualis; translated from the Latin by Bertrand A. Wilberforce. London: Art and Book Company

Later period
Later writings on spiritual direction (as per Top ten reading list for spiritual directors – January 19, 2013):
 
 Teresa Blythe (2018). Spiritual Direction 101: The Basics of Spiritual Guidance. Apocryphile Press, 
 
 
 
 
 
 
 
 
 
 
 Hughson, Shirley Carter (1952) The Spiritual Letters of Father Hughson of the Order of the Holy Cross. West Park, New York: Holy Cross Press; London: A. R. Mowbray, 1953

External links

North America 
 Spiritual Directors International
 Spiritual Direction in California
 Spiritual Direction in Alberta
 Spiritual Direction in Calgary
 Spiritual Direction in Manitoba
 Spiritual Directors in British Columbia
 Tyndale Association of Spiritual Directors, Toronto, Ontario
 Evangelical Spiritual Directors Association

United Kingdom 
 The Retreat Association, an organisation facilitating Christian spiritual directors in the United Kingdom
 London Centre for Spiritual Direction: an organisation that trains and supports spiritual directors, and promotes spiritual direction
 Ignatian Spirituality Course: a training course for spiritual directors in London, UK.

Australia 
 Fullness of Life Centre (Inc.) provides spiritual direction, counselling and professional supervision. Services are available in-person and through secure video conferencing.
 Kardia Formation P/L  provides spiritual direction, supervision and a formation program for spiritual directors.
 Jesuit College of Spirituality provides Ignatian programs of formation for spiritual directors, supervisors and leaders as a member of the University of Divinity, Melbourne.

Spirituality
Religious practices